Amor e Revolução (English title: Love and Revolution;) is a Brazilian telenovela that first aired on SBT in 2011. Written by Tiago Santiago text cooperation with Renata Dias Gomes and Miguel Paiva and directed by Reynaldo Boury.

Cast

 Special guest star
 Samantha Dalsoglio - Vilminha

Curiosities
The soap opera "Amor e Revolução" showed the first lesbian kiss in a Brazilian telenovela with actresses Gisele Tigre and Luciana Vendramini.

Tiago Santiago intended to write a telenovela about the dictatorship since 1995, when he was at Rede Globo.

References

External links
 Official website 
 

2011 Brazilian television series debuts
2012 Brazilian television series endings
2011 telenovelas
Sistema Brasileiro de Televisão telenovelas
Brazilian telenovelas
Brazilian LGBT-related television shows
Television shows set in Rio de Janeiro (city)
Television shows set in São Paulo
Portuguese-language telenovelas